Idi Amin Dada Oumee (16 August 2003) was a Ugandan military officer and politician who served as the third president of Uganda from 1971 to 1979. He ruled as a military dictator and is considered one of the most brutal despots in modern world history.

Amin was born in Koboko in what is now northwest Uganda to a Kakwa father and Lugbara mother. In 1946, he joined the King's African Rifles (KAR) of the British Colonial Army as a cook. He rose to the rank of lieutenant, taking part in British actions against Somali rebels and then the Mau Mau Uprising in Kenya. Uganda gained independence from the United Kingdom in 1962, and Amin remained in the army, rising to the position of major and being appointed commander of the Uganda Army in 1965. He became aware that Ugandan President Milton Obote was planning to arrest him for misappropriating army funds, so he launched the 1971 Ugandan coup d'état and declared himself president.

During his years in power, Amin shifted from being a pro-Western ruler enjoying considerable support from Israel to being backed by Libya's Muammar Gaddafi, Zaire's Mobutu Sese Seko, the Soviet Union, and East Germany. In 1972, Amin expelled Asians, a majority of whom were Indian-Ugandans, leading India to sever diplomatic relations with his regime. In 1975, Amin became the chairman of the Organisation of African Unity (OAU), a Pan-Africanist group designed to promote solidarity among African states. Uganda was a member of the United Nations Commission on Human Rights from 1977 to 1979. The United Kingdom broke diplomatic relations with Uganda in 1977, and Amin declared that he had defeated the British and added "CBE" to his title for "Conqueror of the British Empire".

As Amin's rule progressed into the late 1970s, there was increased unrest against his persecution of certain ethnic groups and political dissidents, along with Uganda's very poor international standing due to Amin's support for the terrorist hijackers in Operation Entebbe. He then attempted to annex Tanzania's Kagera Region in 1978. The Tanzanian president Julius Nyerere ordered his troops to invade Uganda in response. Tanzanian Army and rebel forces successfully captured Kampala in 1979 and ousted Amin from power. Amin went into exile, first in Libya, then Iraq, and finally in Saudi Arabia, where he lived until his death in 2003.

Amin's rule was characterised by rampant human rights abuses, including political repression, ethnic persecution and extrajudicial killings, as well as nepotism, corruption, and gross economic mismanagement. International observers and human rights groups estimate that between 100,000 and 500,000 people were killed under his regime.

Early life
Amin did not write an autobiography, and he did not authorize an official written account of his life. There are discrepancies regarding when and where he was born. Most biographical sources claim that he was born in either Koboko or Kampala around 1925. Other unconfirmed sources state Amin's year of birth from as early as 1923 to as late as 1928. Amin's son Hussein has stated that his father was born in Kampala in 1928.

According to Fred Guweddeko, a researcher at Makerere University, Amin was the son of Andreas Nyabire (1889–1976). Nyabire, a member of the Kakwa ethnic group, converted from Roman Catholicism to Islam in 1910 and changed his name to Amin Dada. He named his first-born son after himself. Abandoned by his father at a young age, Idi Amin grew up with his mother's family in a rural farming town in north-western Uganda. Guweddeko states that Amin's mother was Assa Aatte (1904–1970), an ethnic Lugbara and a traditional herbalist who treated members of Buganda royalty, among others. Some sources have also described Amin as being of mixed Kakwa-Nubian origin.

Amin joined an Islamic school in Bombo in 1941. After a few years, he left school with only a fourth-grade English-language education, and did odd jobs before being recruited to the army by a British colonial army officer.

King's African Rifles 
Amin joined the British King's African Rifles (KAR) in 1946 as an assistant cook, while at the same time receiving military training until 1947. In later life he falsely claimed to have served in the Burma Campaign of World War II. He was transferred to Kenya for infantry service as a private in 1947, and served in the 21st KAR infantry battalion in Gilgil, Kenya Colony until 1949. That year, his unit was deployed to northern Kenya to fight against Somali rebels. In 1952, his brigade was deployed against the Mau Mau rebels in Kenya. He was promoted to corporal the same year, then to sergeant in 1953.

In 1959, Amin was made Effendi class 2 (Warrant Officer), the highest rank possible for a black African in the colonial British military of that time. Amin returned to Uganda the same year and received a short-service commission as a lieutenant on 15 July 1961, becoming one of the first two Ugandans to become commissioned officers. He was assigned to quell the cattle rustling between Uganda's Karamojong and Kenya's Turkana nomads. According to researcher Holger Bernt Hansen, Amin's outlook, behaviour and strategies of communication were strongly influenced by his experiences in the colonial military. This included his direct and hands-on leadership style which would eventually contribute to his popularity among certain parts of Ugandan society.

Rise in the Uganda Army 
In 1962, following Uganda's independence from the United Kingdom, Amin was promoted to captain and then, in 1963, to major. He was appointed Deputy Commander of the Army in 1964 and, the following year, to Commander of the Army. In 1970, he was promoted to commander of all the armed forces.

Amin was an athlete during his time in both the British and Uganda Army. Amin was also a formidable rugby forward, although one officer said of him: "Idi Amin is a splendid type and a good (rugby) player, but virtually bone from the neck up, and needs things explained in words of one letter". In the 1950s, he played for Nile RFC.

There is a frequently repeated urban myth that he was selected as a replacement by the East Africa rugby union team for their 1955 tour match against the British Lions. Amin, however, does not appear in the team photograph or on the official team list. Following conversations with a colleague in the military, Amin became a keen fan of Hayes F.C.; an affection that remained for the rest of his life.

In 1965, Prime Minister Milton Obote and Amin were implicated in a deal to smuggle ivory and gold into Uganda from the Democratic Republic of the Congo. The deal, as later alleged by General Nicholas Olenga, an associate of the former Congolese leader Patrice Lumumba, was part of an arrangement to help troops opposed to the Congolese government trade ivory and gold for arms supplies secretly smuggled to them by Amin. In 1966, the Ugandan Parliament demanded an investigation. Obote imposed a new constitution abolishing the ceremonial presidency held by Kabaka (King) Mutesa II of Buganda, and declared himself executive president. He promoted Amin to colonel and army commander. Amin led an attack on the Kabaka's palace and forced Mutesa into exile to the United Kingdom, where he remained until his death in 1969.

Amin began recruiting members of Kakwa, Lugbara, South Sudanese, and other ethnic groups from the West Nile area bordering South Sudan. The South Sudanese had been residents in Uganda since the early 20th century, having come from South Sudan to serve the colonial army. Many African ethnic groups in northern Uganda inhabit both Uganda and South Sudan; allegations persist that Amin's army consisted mainly of South Sudanese soldiers.

Seizure of power

Eventually a rift developed between Amin and Obote, exacerbated by the support Amin had built within the Uganda Army by recruiting from the West Nile region, his involvement in operations to support the rebellion in southern Sudan and an attempt on Obote's life in 1969. In October 1970, Obote took control of the armed forces, reducing Amin from his months-old post of commander of all the armed forces to that of the commander of the Uganda Army.

Having learned that Obote was planning to arrest him for misappropriating army funds, Amin seized power in a military coup on 25 January 1971, while Obote was attending a Commonwealth summit meeting in Singapore. Troops loyal to Amin sealed off Entebbe International Airport and took Kampala. Soldiers surrounded Obote's residence and blocked major roads. A broadcast on Radio Uganda accused Obote's government of corruption and preferential treatment of the Lango region. Cheering crowds were reported in the streets of Kampala after the radio broadcast. Amin, who presented himself a soldier, not a politician, declared that the military government would remain only as a caretaker regime until new elections, which would be held when the situation was normalised. He promised to release all political prisoners.

Amin held a state funeral in April 1971 for Edward Mutesa, former king (kabaka) of Buganda and president who had died in exile; freed many political prisoners; and reiterated his promise to hold free and fair elections to return the country to democratic rule in the shortest period possible.

Presidency

Establishment of military rule
On 2 February 1971, one week after the coup, Amin declared himself President of Uganda, Commander-in-Chief of the Armed Forces, Uganda Army Chief of Staff, and Chief of Air Staff. He suspended certain provisions of the Ugandan constitution, and soon instituted an Advisory Defence Council composed of military officers with himself as the chairman. Amin placed military tribunals above the system of civil law, appointed soldiers to top government posts and government-owned corporations, and informed the newly inducted civilian cabinet ministers that they would be subject to military courtesy. Amin ruled by decree; over the course of his rule he issued approximately 30 decrees.

Amin renamed the presidential lodge in Kampala from Government House to "The Command Post". He disbanded the General Service Unit (GSU), an intelligence agency created by the previous government, and replaced it with the State Research Bureau (SRB). SRB headquarters at the Kampala suburb of Nakasero became the scene of torture and capital punishment over the next few years. Other agencies used to persecute dissenters included the military police and the Public Safety Unit (PSU).

Obote took refuge in Tanzania, having been offered sanctuary there by the Tanzanian President Julius Nyerere. Obote was soon joined by 20,000 Ugandan refugees fleeing Amin. The exiles attempted but failed to regain Uganda in 1972, through a poorly organised coup attempt.

Persecution of ethnic and political groups
Amin retaliated against the attempted invasion by Ugandan exiles in 1972, by purging the Uganda Army of Obote supporters, predominantly those from the Acholi and Lango ethnic groups. In July 1971, Lango and Acholi soldiers had been massacred in the Jinja and Mbarara barracks. By early 1972, some 5,000 Acholi and Lango soldiers, and at least twice as many civilians, had disappeared. The victims soon came to include members of other ethnic groups, religious leaders, journalists, artists, senior bureaucrats, judges, lawyers, students and intellectuals, criminal suspects, and foreign nationals. In this atmosphere of violence, many other people were killed for criminal motives or simply at will. Bodies were often dumped into the River Nile.

The killings, motivated by ethnic, political, and financial factors, continued throughout Amin's eight years in control. The exact number of people killed is unknown. The International Commission of Jurists estimated the death toll at no fewer than 80,000 and more likely around 300,000. An estimate compiled by exile organisations with the help of Amnesty International puts the number killed at 500,000.

Among the most prominent people killed were Benedicto Kiwanuka, a former prime minister and chief justice; Janani Luwum, the Anglican archbishop; Joseph Mubiru, the former governor of the central bank of Uganda; Frank Kalimuzo, the vice-chancellor of Makerere University; Byron Kawadwa, a prominent playwright; and two of Amin's own cabinet ministers, Erinayo Wilson Oryema and Charles Oboth Ofumbi.

Amin recruited his followers from his own ethnic group, the Kakwas, along with South Sudanese. By 1977, these three groups formed 60 percent of the 22 top generals and 75 percent of the cabinet. Similarly, Muslims formed 80 percent and 87.5 percent of these groups even though they were only 5 percent of the population. This helps explain why Amin survived eight attempted coups. The Uganda Army grew from 10,000 to 25,000 by 1978. Amin's military was largely a mercenary force. Half the soldiers were South Sudanese and 26 percent Congolese, with only 24 percent being Ugandan, mostly Muslim and Kakwa.

In August 1972, Amin declared what he called an "economic war", a set of policies that included the expropriation of properties owned by Asians and Europeans. Uganda's 80,000 Asians were mostly from the Indian subcontinent and born in the country, their ancestors having come to Uganda in search of prosperity when India was still a British colony. Many owned businesses, including large-scale enterprises, which formed the backbone of the Ugandan economy.

On 4 August 1972, Amin issued a decree ordering the expulsion of the 50,000 Asians who were British passport holders. This was later amended to include all 60,000 Asians who were not Ugandan citizens. Around 30,000 Ugandan Asians emigrated to the UK. Others went to Commonwealth countries such as Australia, South Africa, Canada, and Fiji, or to India, Kenya, Pakistan, Sweden, Tanzania, and the United States. Amin expropriated businesses and properties belonging to the Asians and the Europeans and handed them over to his supporters. Without the experienced owners and proprietors, businesses were mismanaged and many industries collapsed from lack of operational expertise and maintenance. This proved disastrous for the already declining Ugandan economy. At the time, Asians accounted for 90% of the country's tax revenue; with their removal, Amin's administration lost a large chunk of government revenue. The economy all but collapsed.

In 1975, Emmanuel Blayo Wakhweya, Idi Amin's finance minister and longest-serving cabinet member at the time, defected to London. This prominent defection helped Henry Kyemba, Amin's health minister and a former official of the first Obote regime, to defect in 1977 and resettle in the UK. Kyemba wrote and published A State of Blood, the first insider exposé of Amin's rule.

On 25 June 1976, the Defence Council declared Amin president for life.

International relations

Initially, Amin was supported by Western powers such as Israel, West Germany, and, in particular, Great Britain. During the late 1960s, Obote's move to the left, which included his Common Man's Charter and the nationalisation of 80 British companies, had made the West worried that he would pose a threat to Western capitalist interests in Africa and make Uganda an ally of the Soviet Union. Amin, who had served with the King's African Rifles and taken part in Britain's suppression of the Mau Mau uprising prior to Ugandan independence, was known by the British as "intensely loyal to Britain". This made him an obvious choice as Obote's successor. Although some have claimed that Amin was being groomed for power as early as 1966, the plotting by the British and other Western powers began in earnest in 1969, after Obote had begun his nationalisation programme.

Throughout the first year of his presidency, Amin received key military and financial support from the United Kingdom and Israel. In July 1971 he visited both countries and asked for advanced military equipment, but the states refused to provide hardware unless the Ugandan government paid for it. Amin decided to seek foreign support elsewhere and in February 1972 he visited Libya. Amin denounced Zionism, and in return Libyan leader Muammar Gaddafi pledged Uganda an immediate $25 million loan to be followed by more lending from the Libyan–Ugandan Development Bank. Over the following months Amin successively removed Israeli military advisers from his government, expelled all other Israeli technicians, and finally broke diplomatic relations. Gaddafi also mediated a resolution to long-standing Ugandan–Sudanese tensions, with Amin agreeing to stop backing Anyanya rebels in southern Sudan and instead recruit the former guerilla fighters into his army.

Following the expulsion of Ugandan Asians in 1972, most of whom were of Indian descent, India severed diplomatic relations with Uganda. The same year, as part of his "economic war", Amin broke diplomatic ties with the United Kingdom and nationalised all British-owned businesses. The United Kingdom and Israel ceased all trade with Uganda, but this commercial gap was quickly filled by Libya, the United States, and the Soviet Union.

The Soviet Union grew interested in Uganda as a strategic counterbalance to perceived Chinese influence in Tanzania and Western influence in Kenya. It dispatched a military mission to Uganda in November 1973. While it could not supply the financial level available from the Western powers, the Soviet Union opted to provide Amin with military hardware in exchange for his support. The Soviet Union quickly became Amin's largest arms supplier, sending Uganda tanks, jets, artillery, missiles, and small arms. By 1975, it was estimated that the Soviets had provided Amin's government with $12 million in economic assistance and $48 million in arms. Amin also sent several thousand Ugandans to Eastern Bloc countries for military, intelligence, and technical training, especially Czechoslovakia. East Germany was involved in the General Service Unit and the State Research Bureau, the two agencies that were most notorious for terror. Later during the Ugandan invasion of Tanzania in 1979, East Germany attempted to remove evidence of its involvement with these agencies.

In June 1976, Amin allowed an Air France airliner from Tel Aviv to Paris hijacked by two members of the Popular Front for the Liberation of Palestine – External Operations (PFLP-EO) and two members of the German Revolutionäre Zellen to land at Entebbe Airport. The hijackers were joined there by three more. Soon after, 156 non-Jewish hostages who did not hold Israeli passports were released and flown to safety, while 83 Jews and Israeli citizens, as well as 20 others who refused to abandon them (among whom were the captain and crew of the hijacked Air France jet), continued to be held hostage. In the subsequent Israeli rescue operation, codenamed Operation Thunderbolt (popularly known as Operation Entebbe), on the night of 3–4 July 1976, a group of Israeli commandos flew in from Israel and seized control of Entebbe Airport, freeing nearly all the hostages. Three hostages died during the operation and 10 were wounded; 7 hijackers, about 45 Ugandan soldiers, and 1 Israeli soldier, Yoni Netanyahu (the commander of the unit), were killed. A fourth hostage, 75-year-old Dora Bloch, an elderly Jewish Englishwoman who had been taken to Mulago Hospital in Kampala before the rescue operation, was subsequently murdered in reprisal. The incident further soured Uganda's international relations, leading the United Kingdom to close its High Commission in Uganda. In retaliation for Kenya's assistance in the raid, Amin also ordered the killing of hundreds of Kenyans living in Uganda.

Uganda under Amin embarked on a large military build-up, which raised concerns in Kenya. Early in June 1975, Kenyan officials impounded a large convoy of Soviet-made arms en route to Uganda at the port of Mombasa. Tension between Uganda and Kenya reached its climax in February 1976, when Amin announced that he would investigate the possibility that parts of southern Sudan and western and central Kenya, up to within  of Nairobi, were historically a part of colonial Uganda. The Kenyan Government responded with a stern statement that Kenya would not part with "a single inch of territory". Amin backed down after the Kenyan army deployed troops and armoured personnel carriers along the Kenya–Uganda border. Amin's relations with Rwanda were tense, and during his tenure he repeatedly jeopardized its economy by denying its commercial vehicles transit to Mombasa and made multiple threats to bomb Kigali.

Deposition and exile

In January 1977 Amin appointed General Mustafa Adrisi Vice President of Uganda. That year, a split in the Uganda Army developed between supporters of Amin and soldiers loyal to Adrisi, who held significant power in the government and wanted to purge foreigners, particularly Sudanese, from the military. The growing dissatisfaction in the Uganda Army was reflected by frequent coup attempts; Amin was even wounded during one of them, namely Operation Mafuta Mingi in June 1977. By 1978, the number of Amin's supporters and close associates had shrunk significantly, and he faced increasing dissent from the populace within Uganda as the economy and infrastructure collapsed as a result of the years of neglect and abuse. After the killings of Bishop Luwum and ministers Oryema and Oboth Ofumbi in 1977, several of Amin's ministers defected or fled into exile. In early 1978, Adrisi was severely injured in a car accident and flown to Cairo for treatment. While he was there, Amin stripped him of his positions as Minister of Defence and Minister of Home Affairs and denounced him for retiring senior prison officials without his knowledge. Amin then proceeded to purge several high-ranking officials from his government and took personal control of several ministerial portfolios. The shakeup caused political unrest and especially angered Adrisi's followers, who believed that the car accident was a failed assassination attempt.

In November 1978, troops loyal to Adrisi mutinied. Amin sent troops against the mutineers, some of whom had fled across the Tanzanian border. Fighting consequently broke out along the Ugandan–Tanzanian border, and the Uganda Army launched an invasion of Tanzanian territory under unclear circumstances. According to several experts and politicians, Amin directly ordered the invasion in an attempt to distract the Ugandan military and public from the crisis at home. Other accounts suggest, however, that Amin had lost control of parts of the Uganda Army. Accordingly, the invading troops acted without his orders, and Amin sanctioned the invasion post facto to save face. In any case, Amin accused Tanzanian President Julius Nyerere of initiating the war against Uganda after the hostilities had erupted, and proclaimed the annexation of a section of Kagera when the Ugandan invasion initially proved to be successful. However, as Tanzania began to prepare a counter-offensive, Amin reportedly realised his precarious situation, and attempted to defuse the conflict without losing face. The Ugandan President publicly suggested that he and Nyerere participate in a boxing match which, in lieu of military action, would determine the outcome of the conflict. Nyerere ignored the message.

In January 1979, Nyerere mobilised the Tanzania People's Defence Force and counterattacked, joined by several groups of Ugandan exiles who had united as the Uganda National Liberation Army (UNLA). Amin's army retreated steadily, despite military help from Libya's Muammar Gaddafi and the Palestine Liberation Organisation (PLO). The President reportedly made several trips abroad to other countries such as Saudi Arabia and Iraq during the war, attempting to enlist more foreign support. He made few public appearances in the final months of his rule, but spoke frequently on radio and television. Following a major defeat in the Battle of Lukaya, parts of the Uganda Army command reportedly urged Amin to step down. He angrily refused, and declared: "If you don't want to fight, I'll do it myself." He consequently fired chief of staff Yusuf Gowon. However, Amin was forced to flee the Ugandan capital by helicopter on 11 April 1979, when Kampala was captured. After a short-lived attempt to rally some remnants of the Uganda Army in eastern Uganda which reportedly included Amin proclaiming the city of Jinja his country's new capital, he fled into exile. Amin first escaped to Libya, where he stayed until 1980, and ultimately settled in Saudi Arabia, where the Saudi royal family allowed him sanctuary and paid him a generous subsidy in return for staying out of politics. Amin lived for a number of years on the top two floors of the Novotel Hotel on Palestine Road in Jeddah. Brian Barron, who covered the Uganda–Tanzania War for the BBC as chief Africa correspondent, together with cameraman Mohamed Amin (no relation) of Visnews in Nairobi, located Amin in 1980, and secured the first interview with him since his deposition. While in exile, Amin funded remnants of his army that fought in the Ugandan Bush War. Though he continued to be a controversial figure, some of Amin's former followers as well as several rebel groups continued to fight in his name for decades, and occasionally advocated for his amnesty and even his restoration to Ugandan Presidency. During interviews he gave during his exile in Saudi Arabia, Amin held that Uganda needed him, and never expressed remorse for the brutal nature of his regime.

In 1989, Amin left his exile without authorization by the Saudi Arabian government, and flew alongside one of his sons to Zaire. There, he intended to mobilize a rebel force to reconquer Uganda which was engulfed in another civil war at the time. The rest of his family stayed in Jeddah. Despite using a false Zairean passport, Amin was easily recognized upon arriving with Air Zaïre at N'djili Airport, and promptly arrested by Zairean security forces. The Zairean government reacted unfavourably to Amin's arrival, and attempted to expel him from the country. At first, Saudi Arabia refused to allow him to return, as its government was deeply offended that he had "abused their hospitality" by leaving without permission. The Zairean government wanted neither to extradite Amin to Uganda where the ex-president faced murder charges nor keep him in Zaire, thereby straining international relations. As a result, Amin was initially expelled to Senegal from where he was supposed to be sent to Saudi Arabia, but the Senegalese government sent him back to Zaire when Saudi Arabia continued to refuse Amin a visa. Following appeals by Moroccan King Hassan II, the Saudi Arabian leadership finally relented and allowed Amin to return. In return, Amin had to promise to never again participate in any political or military activities or give interviews. He consequently spent the remainder of his life in Saudi Arabia.

In the final years of his life, Amin reportedly ate a fruitarian diet. His daily consumption of oranges earned him the nickname "Dr Jaffa" among Saudi Arabians.

Illness and death
On 19 July 2003, Amin's fourth wife, Nalongo Madina, reported that he was in a coma and near death at the King Faisal Specialist Hospital and Research Centre in Jeddah, Saudi Arabia, from kidney failure. She pleaded with the Ugandan president, Yoweri Museveni, to allow him to return to Uganda for the remainder of his life. Museveni replied that Amin would have to "answer for his sins the moment he was brought back". Amin's family eventually decided to disconnect life support, and Amin consequently died at the hospital in Jeddah on 16 August 2003. He was buried in Ruwais Cemetery in Jeddah in a simple grave, without any fanfare.

After Amin's death, David Owen revealed that during his term as the British Foreign Secretary (1977 to 1979), he had proposed having Amin assassinated. He has defended this, arguing: "I'm not ashamed of considering it, because his regime goes down in the scale of Pol Pot as one of the worst of all African regimes".

Family and associates

A polygamist, Idi Amin married at least six women, three of whom he divorced. He married his first and second wives, Malyamu and Kay, in 1966. In 1967, he married Nora, and then married Nalongo Madina in 1972. On 26 March 1974, he announced on Radio Uganda that he had divorced Malyamu, Nora, and Kay. Malyamu was arrested in Tororo on the Kenyan border in April 1974 and accused of attempting to smuggle a bolt of fabric into Kenya. In 1974, Kay Amin died under mysterious circumstances, with her body found dismembered. Nora fled to Zaire in 1979; her current whereabouts are unknown.

In July 1975, Amin staged a £2 million wedding to 19-year-old Sarah Kyolaba, a go-go dancer with the Revolutionary Suicide Mechanised Regiment Band, nicknamed "Suicide Sarah". The wedding was held during the Organisation of African Unity (OAU) summit meeting in Kampala, and the chairman of the Palestine Liberation Organisation, Yasser Arafat served as Amin's best man. Before she met Amin, Sarah was living with a boyfriend, Jesse Gitta; he vanished and it is not clear if he was beheaded, or detained after fleeing to Kenya. The couple had four children and enjoyed rally race driving Amin's Citroën SM, with Sarah as navigator. Sarah was a hairdresser in Tottenham when she died in 2015.

By 1993, Amin was living with the last nine of his children and one wife, Mama a Chumaru, the mother of the youngest four of his children. His last known child, daughter Iman, was born in 1992. According to The Monitor, Amin married again a few months before his death in 2003, and converted to Islam during his exile.

Amin fathered as many as 60 children. Until 2003, Taban Amin (born 1955), Idi Amin's eldest son, was the leader of West Nile Bank Front (WNBF), a rebel group opposed to the government of Yoweri Museveni. In 2005, he was offered amnesty by Museveni, and in 2006, he was appointed Deputy Director General of the Internal Security Organisation. Another of Amin's sons, Haji Ali Amin, ran for election as Chairman (i.e. mayor) of Njeru Town Council in 2002 but was not elected. In early 2007, the award-winning film The Last King of Scotland prompted one of his sons, Jaffar Amin (born in 1967), to speak out in his father's defence. Jaffar Amin said he was writing a book to rehabilitate his father's reputation. Jaffar is the tenth of Amin's 40 official children by seven official wives.

Among Amin's closest associates was the Briton Bob Astles. Isaac Maliyamungu was an instrumental affiliate and one of the more feared officers in Amin's army.

Character

Nicknames 
Over the course of his career, Amin gained numerous nicknames, many of them derogatory:
 "Big Daddy": affectionate nickname
 kijambiya ("the machete"): attributed to Ugandan security forces often murdering their victims with machetes
 "Butcher of Uganda"
 "Butcher of Africa"
 "Butcher of Kampala"
 "Black Hitler"
 "Dada": It is disputed whether this was part of Amin's family name or a nickname. Some observers have claimed that it originated as a nickname for Amin's "cowardly" behavior, as it can be translated as "sister", though this has been strongly disputed by others. Amin's family has stated that "Dada" was simply an alternate name for the Lugbara people which is occasionally used as a personal name. Researcher Mark Leopold judged this to be more likely than the nickname theory.
"Dr. Jaffa": he earned this nickname in exile in Saudi Arabia due to his daily consumption of oranges, especially after allegedly transitioning to fruitarianism.

Erratic behaviour, self-bestowed titles and media portrayal 

As the years progressed, Amin's behaviour became more erratic, unpredictable, and strident. After the United Kingdom broke off all diplomatic relations with his regime in 1977, Amin declared that he had defeated the British, and he conferred on himself the decoration of CBE (Conqueror of the British Empire). His full self-bestowed title ultimately became: "His Excellency, President for Life, Field Marshal Al Hadji Doctor Idi Amin Dada, VC, DSO, MC, CBE, Lord of All the Beasts of the Earth and Fishes of the Seas and Conqueror of the British Empire in Africa in General and Uganda in Particular", in addition to his officially stated claim of being the uncrowned king of Scotland. He never received the Distinguished Service Order (DSO) or the Military Cross (MC). He conferred a doctorate of law on himself from Makerere University as well as the Victorious Cross (VC), a medal made to emulate the British Victoria Cross.

Amin became the subject of rumours, including a widespread belief that he was a cannibal. Amin reportedly also boasted that he kept the decapitated heads of political enemies in his freezer, although he said that human flesh was generally "too salty" for his taste.

During Amin's time in power, popular media outside of Uganda often portrayed him as an essentially comic and eccentric figure. Julius Harris emphasized Amin's allegedly clownish side in Victory at Entebbe, while Yaphet Kotto drew more praise for projecting Amin's sinister nature in Raid on Entebbe. In a 1977 assessment typical of the time, a Time magazine article described him as a "killer and clown, big-hearted buffoon and strutting martinet". The comedy-variety series Saturday Night Live aired four Amin sketches between 1976 and 1979, including one in which he was an ill-behaved houseguest in exile, and another in which he was a spokesman against venereal disease. In 1979, radio host Don Imus made multiple on-air telephone calls in an attempt to talk to Amin, and later hosted a phony interview with him that was deemed "very dirty." In a Benny Hill Show episode transmitted in January 1977, Hill portrayed Amin sitting behind a desk that featured a placard reading "ME TARZAN, U GANDA".

The foreign media were often criticised by Ugandan exiles and defectors for emphasising Amin's self-aggrandizing eccentricities and taste for excess while downplaying or excusing his murderous behaviour. Other commentators even suggested that Amin had deliberately cultivated his eccentric reputation in the foreign media as an easily parodied buffoon in order to defuse international concern over his administration of Uganda. Ugandan soldier and rebel Patrick Kimumwe argued that Amin's "clowning conceal[ed] a ruthless extinction of human rights" in Uganda. Journalists Tony Avirgan and Martha Honey wrote, "facile explanations of Amin's regime, as either a one-man show or a lawless and ruthless band of killers, do not get at the heart of the power structure."

Legacy
Gender historian Alicia Decker wrote that the "deeply embedded culture of militarism in Uganda is undoubtedly Amin's most enduring legacy." His reputation in Uganda has been viewed over the decades following his rule in more complex ways than in the international community. Some Ugandans have praised him as a "patriot" and supported his decision to expel Asians from the country. At the time of his death, he was particularly well-regarded in north-western Uganda. One of Amin's sons, Jaffar Remo, criticised the negative public perception of his father and called for a commission to investigate the veracity of the abuses committed under his rule.

In popular culture
During the 1970s, while Amin was at the height of his infamy, British comic actor John Bird starred on the album The Collected Broadcasts of Idi Amin, with lyrics based on Alan Coren's anti-Amin Punch columns. In 1975 the satirical single "Amazin' Man", from the album, was released on the Transatlantic label. The record stayed for 12 weeks in the Australian Singles Chart, peaking at number 26.

A 1974 documentary film General Idi Amin Dada: A Self Portrait by director Barbet Schroeder was made with the support and participation of Idi Amin. Rise and Fall of Idi Amin (1981) is a Kenyan film that details the history of Idi Amin's reign. This film popularized many rumors about Amin's brutality, such as his alleged mutilation of one of his wives. Amin is played by Joseph Olita, who reprised this role in Mississippi Masala (1991), a film about romance between African and Asian-Americans following Amin's 1972 expulsion of Asians from Uganda. 

Amin is the subject of English journalist Giles Foden's book The Last King of Scotland (1998), which focuses on Idi Amin's Uganda through the eyes of a young Scottish physician. In 2006, it was adapted into a movie, where Amin is portrayed by Forest Whitaker. Whittaker won the best leading actor award for this role at the Academy Awards, the Golden Globes, the Screen Actor's Guild Award, and the BAFTAs.

See also
Notable adherents of fruitarianism

Notes

References

Sources

 
 
 Cotton, Fran (Ed., 1984). The Book of Rugby Disasters & Bizarre Records. Compiled by Chris Rhys. London. Century Publishing. .

External links

The Idi Amin I knew, Brian Barron, BBC, 16 August 2003. Includes a video of Brian Barron interviewing Idi Amin in exile in 1980. The Atlantic – 1 April 2001 Memo and Quincy LS the series
General Idi Amin Dada: A Self Portrait on Google Videos (Flash Video)
idiamindada.com, a website devoted to Idi Amin's legacy created by his son Jaffar Amin

 
1920s births
2003 deaths
Age controversies
Anti-Indian racism in Africa
Antisemitism in Africa
British colonial army soldiers
British military personnel of the Mau Mau Uprising
Date of birth unknown
Deaths from kidney failure
Disease-related deaths in Saudi Arabia
Exiled politicians
Field marshals
Fugitives
King's African Rifles officers
Leaders who took power by coup
Light-heavyweight boxers
Military personnel of the Uganda–Tanzania War
People from Kampala
People from West Nile sub-region
People of the Cold War
People of the Congo Crisis
Presidents for life
Presidents of Uganda
Pretenders to the Scottish throne
Ugandan exiles
Ugandan expatriates in Saudi Arabia
Ugandan generals
Ugandan male boxers
Ugandan Muslims
Ugandan pan-Africanists
Ugandan rugby union players
Ugandan sportsperson-politicians
Politicide perpetrators
20th-century criminals